The Australian Film Institute Award for Best Achievement in Sound is awarded yearly by the Australian Film Institute for excellence in sound editing. The award was first distributed in 1977 with the first winner being William Anderson for the film Don's Party.

Winners and nominees

References

S
Film sound awards